Andrei or Andrey Markov  may refer to:

 Andrey Markov (1856–1922), Russian mathematician
 Andrey Markov Jr. (1903–1979), Soviet mathematician
 Andrey Markov (politician) (born 1972), Russian politician
 Andrei Markov (ice hockey) (born 1978), Russian ice hockey defenceman
 Andrei Markov (footballer) (born 1984), Russian footballer